Tchórzew may refer to one of the following locations in Poland:

Tchórzew, Lublin Voivodeship
Tchórzew, Masovian Voivodeship
Tchórzew-Plewki
Tchórzew-Kolonia